Macrocheles analis is a species of mite in the family Macrochelidae.

References

analis
Articles created by Qbugbot
Animals described in 1988